Dent-de-Leone is a small independent publisher located in London, distinctive for its collaboration directly with artists and designers to produce its books. It was founded by  Martino Gamper, Kajsa Ståhl and Maki Suzuki (both from design collective Åbäke) in 2004 with the publication of a book by Gamper. The publisher produces an irregular number of books per year, as well as limited editions and multiples. Dent-De-Leone has participated in numerous art book fairs including the Whitechapel Art Book Fair, Publish And Be Damned and the Motto art book fair. All of its publications are designed by Åbäke.

Politics 
Dent-de-Leone were inspired by Factory Records early contracts, so that each artist retains the ownership of their back catalogue. They sell direct to individuals and bookshops bypassing the usual model of selling in bulk to book distributors who often take a large percentage of the cover price. Doing this allows Dent-de-Leone to offer a low retail price for their work, and pay a large proportion to the published artist. All profits are directed into making new books.
Dent-de-Leone began as a vanity publishing project, but quickly expanded as other artists and designers contacted the publishers attracted by the avant-garde design and the distribution model. The books are intended to disseminate the ideas and aesthetics of the published artists, designers and writers.
The free Typeface WAR is available on the website of Dent-de-Leone. WAR is a typeface which deconstructs all the "official" countries' flags (2006) to allow a random redesign of your own country.

Origin of the name 
The name Dent-De-Leone is derived from the dandelion, a common plant often cooked during the Social Pasta events created by Martino Gamper and Åbäke. Some of these projects are detailed in the book Social Pasta.

Publications 
The publisher's first book was Gamper's What Martino Gamper did between two-thousand and two-thousand&four. Later publications include 100 Chairs in 100 Days and its 100 ways by Martino Gamper in 2007, which after selling out has been republished as a pocket book. The book and exhibition 100 Chairs in 100 Days and its 100 ways has traveled to, 5 Cromwell Place; London, UFO; Germany, Triennale Design Museum; Milano in Italy, YBCA, San Francisco, USA. In 2009 Piccolo Volume —II— was co-published with the Milan (Italy) based furniture gallery Nilufar. This book acted as the continuation of 100 Chairs in 100 Days and its 100 ways (the cover was numbered 101) and also fitted into Nilufar's revered catalogue collection.

Aurélien Froment conducted an extended interview with the legendary German film director Werner Herzog which is detailed in the book Like the Cow Jumped Over the Moon. Froment's Pulmo Marina is a film and a book about a jellyfish resident at the Monterey Bay Aquarium in San Francisco, USA.

Another project of Åbäke is a version of Thomas Moore's 1516 novel Utopia, set in the typeface developed by Moore for the island and thus virtually impossible to read.

Francis Upritchard's has had two books published with Dent-de-Leone. The first was Every Colour By Itself, which looks like a ladybird book but the size of a National Geographic magazine book and features pictures of both the front and rear of her sculptures in vibrant colors, which is now out of print. The second book In die Höhle was produced for her exhibition at the Vienna Secession in Austria. and included an original short story by David Mitchell. It was a Riso printed limited edition of 80 which has also sold out. A second augmented edition of this book was produced and co published by Vienna Secession and König Books.

Peter Jensen & Mary Miles Minter & Mildred & Emma & Olga & Nancy & Gertrude & Cindy & Tonya & Fanny & Sissy & Helena & Tina & Christina & Mink & Candice-Marie & Jodie & Jytte & Laurie & Muriel & Shelley & Anna Karina is a survey of 20 seasons of Peter Jensen's work through the muses who inspired him for each collection.

Co-publishing 
There have been some occasions of co-publishing with Vienna Secession, Nilufar Gallery (Milan), Gasworks Gallery (London), Hollybushgardens Gallery (London) & with Motive Gallery (Amsterdam).

Awards 
Dent-de-Leone recently won a Grafik Magazine award for the publication Every Colour by Itself by Francis Upritchard.

Bibliography 
 100 Chairs in 100 Days and in 100 Ways: Martino Gamper, 2007, ed. & design Åbäke, Published by Dent-De-Leone, Uk, 2nd edition in 2010 
 Like the Cow Jumped Over the Moon: Aurélien Froment, 2009, ed. & design Åbäke, Published by Dent-De-Leone, Uk, 
 In die Höhle by Francis Upritchard, Co-published with Vienna Secession and Dent-De-Leone,  (2nd edition Co-published with Vienna Secession and König Books )
 Every Colour By Itself: Francis Upritchard, 2009, ed. & design Åbäke, Published by Dent-De-Leone, Uk, 
 The Victoria & Alferd Museum Broadsheet #8 by Åbäke
 (In)Visible Dialogues, 2011, ed. Elias Arnér and Per Huttner, ed. & design by Åbäke. Published by Dent-de-Leone.  and 
 Peter Jensen & Mary Miles Minter & Mildred & Emma & Olga & Nancy & Gertrude & Cindy & Tonya & Fanny & Sissy & Helena & Tina & Christina & Mink & Candice-Marie & Jodie & Jytte & Laurie & Muriel & Shelley & Anna Karina, 2011, ed. Peter Jensen, Gerard Wilson & Åbäke, Design Åbäke, Published by Dent-De-Leone, Uk, 
 Table of Recall: Aurélien Froment, 2011, design Åbäke, Published by Dent-De-Leone, Uk, 
 I Cling to Virtue: Monarch Lövy Singh (Noam Toran & Onkar Kular), 2011, design Åbäke, Published by Dent-De-Leone, Uk, 
 Pulmo Marina: Aurélien Froment, 2011, design Åbäke, Published by Dent-De-Leone, Uk, 
 Utopia in Utopia: Åbäke, 2011, Published by Dent-De-Leone, Uk, 
 OuUnPo[RTO], 2013, edited by Claudia Squitieri and Samon Takahashi, texts by OuUnPo, designed by Åbäke published by Dent-de-Leone and Vision Forum, .

Artists published by Dent-de-Leone
 Elias Arnér
 Aurélien Froment
 Martino Gamper
 Ryan Gander
 Luke Gottelier
 Per Huttner
 Peter Jensen
 Onkar Kular
 Benoît Maire
 Eline Mcgeorge
 David Mitchell
 Nova Paul
 Yuri Suzuki
 Noam Toran
 Francis Upritchard
 Anita Witek
 Åbäke

References

External links
Dent-de-Leone
åbäke website
Luke Gottelier 
Kate MacGarry
Martino Gamper
Noam Toran
Onkar Kular
Eline McGeorge
Per Huttner
Elias Arnér 
Atelier des Arques
Victoria & Albert Museum
Secession
Nilufar 
Gasworks
Hollybushgardens
Motive Gallery

Book publishing companies based in London
Publishing companies established in 2004